Crescent Girls' School (CGS) is a government autonomous girls' school along Tanglin Road, Singapore. Founded in 1956, it is one of the schools under the Worldwide Microsoft Innovative Schools Programme.

History
CGS's was founded in 1955 as Alexandra Estate Secondary School with an intake of 117 boys and 53 girls. A year later, the boys were transferred to Pasir Panjang Secondary School. Evelyn Norris took over as principal from S. C. Thong and CGS came into existence as a girls' school in 1956.

The crest, motto and school song date from the school's early history. The yellow and peacock blue uniforms were very much as they are today. Crescent's Brass Band, which later became the Symphonic Band, won its first gold medal two years later.

Many buildings were added or acquired over the years from 1973 to 1990 at the Prince Charles Square. In December 1990, the school moved to temporary premises at Queensway to enable the rebuilding of CGS on its old site.

In January 1994, the school relocated to its old site along Tanglin Road, where a new school building had been constructed. The latest addition to the school building is the arts conservatory, which was launched by Education Minister Tharman Shanmugaratnam in July 2006.

The school was declared by Bill Gates at the 2007 Global Leaders Forum (January 31, 2007) as mentor school for schools of the future around the world. Crescent now mentors schools in 12 countries under the Worldwide Microsoft Innovative Schools Programme.

On 26 January 2010, the Hewlett-Packard-Crescent Girls' School Green Lab@CGS was officially launched by Ronnie Tay, Chief Executive Officer of the Infocomm Development Authority. The Green Lab@CGS, a collaboration between Hewlett-Packard and Crescent, was initiated due to rising concerns about the environment and global warming.

On 17 May 2010, CGS set a new record in the Singapore Book of Records for the most people wearing Friendship Bands at one location with 1,295 participants. The Friendship Bands, made by the students and staff, are part of CGS's contribution to the 2010 Summer Youth Olympics. The Friendship Bands would be presented to the Youth Olympic athletes from around the world.

CGS was awarded the School Excellence Award, the highest award in the Ministry of Education's Masterplan of Awards.

Academic information

O Level express course 
CGS offers the four-year Express course which leads to the Singapore-Cambridge GCE Ordinary Level examinations.

Academic subjects 
The examinable academic subjects for Singapore-Cambridge GCE Ordinary Level offered by Crescent Girls' School for upper secondary level (via. streaming in secondary 2 level), as of 2017, are listed below.

Notes:
 Subjects indicated with ' * ' are mandatory subjects.
 All students in Singapore are required to undertake a Mother Tongue Language as an examinable subject, as indicated by ' ^ '.
 "SPA" in Pure Science subjects refers to the incorporation of School-based Science Practical Assessment, which 20% of the subject result in the national examination are determined by school-based practical examinations, supervised by the Singapore Examinations and Assessment Board. The SPA Assessment has been replaced by one Practical Assessment in the 2018 O Levels.

Co-curricular Activities (CCAs)
Crescent Girls' School offers a spectrum of co-curricular activities (CCAs) by the Ministry of Education, consisting of sport CCAs, performing arts, clubs and societies as well as Uniform Groups, totalling to 19 CCAs.

Sports CCAs
Badminton
Canoeing
Hockey
Netball
Softball
Track and Field
Performing Arts CCAs
Crescent Angklung and Kulintang Ensemble (C.A.K.E.)
Crezchorale (Choir)
Chinese and Modern Dance Society 
Crescent Girls' School Symphonic Band (CGSSB)
Clubs and Societies
Audio and Visual Aid Club (AVA)
Chess Club
Computer Club
Digital Art and Photography Club (DAPC)
English Drama Society
Innovation & Enterprise Club (I&E)
Uniform Groups
Girl Guides
National Cadet Corps (Land) (NCC)
Red Cross Youth

Notable alumnae
 Jeanette Aw, Mediacorp actress
 Chen Liping, Mediacorp actress
 Ho Ching, former Chief Executive Officer of Temasek Holdings
 Lim Hwee Hua, former Cabinet minister
 Meutya Hafid, Indonesian politician and former journalist
 Stella Ng, former Mandopop singer
 Tin Pei Ling, member of parliament for MacPherson SMC

References

External links
 Official website

Autonomous schools in Singapore
Secondary schools in Singapore
Girls' schools in Singapore
Bukit Merah
Educational institutions established in 1956
Schools in Central Region, Singapore
1956 establishments in Malaya